El-Bawiti (Arabic: الباويطي, al-Bāwīṭī, from ) is a town in the Western desert in Egypt. With 30,000 inhabitants, it is the largest settlement in the Bahariya Oasis.

The tombs of Qarat Qasr Salim hill
On a low ridge overlooking El-Bawiti are a pair of nicely decorated underground tombs of the 26th Dynasty, a high time in Bahariya Oasis. The tombs, belonging to the wealthy local merchants Zed-Amun-ef-Ankh and his son Banentiu, have an inner court with 4 columns and up to 7 side chambers.

The tomb of Zed-Amun-ef-Ankh has colorful pictures of the gods carrying out the mortuary rituals. The ceiling is painted with a starry sky. The columns of the tomb of Banentiu are painted with deities and the ceiling has a winged sun-disk. The walls by the entrance show the journeys of the moon and the sun.

References

External links
 Touristic sites around Bawiti
 Bawiti Tourist-Information on Wikivoyage about Bawiti (German)

Populated places in Giza Governorate